Ceadîr-Lunga Stadium is a stadium in Ceadîr-Lunga, Moldova. It has a capacity of 2,000 seats.

History 
FC Saxan played their first match in the stadium in 2012.

References

Football venues in Moldova